Rahealty, or Rahelty, is an electoral division in County Tipperary in Ireland.

It was originally created as an electoral division  in the Thurles poor law union in North Tipperary. Although the poor law unions have long been abolished, this electoral division, although with boundaries that have been modified over the years, is still used for various administrative purposes.

Ratepayers, Tenants and Landlords

In 1842, the landlords in this electoral district  included the Earl of Orkney, Earl of Milton and Lady Lovett.

Relationship to the civil parish

At the time of the 1911 and 2011 censuses, the electoral division contained nineteen townlands.
Among these were ten townlands of the eighteen that belong to the civil parish of the same name

Athlummon
Coolaculla
Garranroe
 
Knockanacunna
Lisduff
Loughbeg
 
Piercetown
Rahelty
Rathcriddoge
 
Rathmanna

as well as townlands from five other civil parishes, these being

Athnid Beg (from Athnid parish)
Athnid More (from Athnid parish)
Kilclonagh (from Kilclonagh parish)

Rossestown (from Shyane parish)
Ballygammane (from Thurles parish)
Loughlahan (from Thurles parish)

Coldfields (from Two-mile Burris parish)
Garraun (from Two-mile Burris parish)
Rathmanna (from Two-mile Burris parish)

In both censuses, the following townlands which belong to Rahelty civil parish were not included in Rahelty electoral division:

Archerstown
Cassestown

Corbally
Drish
   
Knockroe
Kyle

Shanballyduff
Townagha

Statistics
At the time of the 2011 census, the division had a population of 765, of whom 386 were male and 379 were female. The total housing stock was 273, of which 20 dwellings were vacant.

References

Electoral divisions in County Tipperary
Electoral divisions in North Tipperary